Lamb Corner is a hamlet on the B1029 road, in the civil parish of Dedham in the Colchester district, in the county of Essex, England. Lamb Corner formerly had a pub, but is now a collection of houses around the Black Brook dating from the medieval period to the 21st century.

References 

A-Z Essex, 2010 edition. p. 161.

Hamlets in Essex
Dedham, Essex